Vai Pandal is a 1984 Indian Tamil-language comedy film directed by Rama Narayanan, starring Mohan and Urvashi .

Cast

Soundtrack

Reception

References

External links

1980 films
1984 films
1980s Tamil-language films
Films scored by Shankar–Ganesh
Films directed by Rama Narayanan